Arthur the King is an upcoming American adventure film directed by Simon Cellan Jones and starring Mark Wahlberg and Simu Liu.  It is based on the 2017 nonfiction book Arthur: The Dog Who Crossed The Jungle To Find A Home by Mikael Lindnord.

Cast
Mark Wahlberg as Mikael Lindnord
Simu Liu as Liam
Nathalie Emmanuel
Ali Suliman
Rob Collins
Michael Landes

Production
Both Paramount Players and Lionsgate were attached to distribute the film.  Baltasar Kormákur was initially going to helm the film but dropped out due to schedule conflicts.

The casting of Mark Wahlberg as Lindnord was announced in July 2019.  In December 2020, it was announced that Simu Liu, Ali Suliman and Rob Collins were cast in the film and that Simon Cellan Jones would replace Kormákur.

Filming occurred in the Dominican Republic and as of January 2022, the film is currently in post-production.

References

External links
 

Upcoming films
Adventure films based on actual events
American films based on actual events
American adventure films
Entertainment One films
Films about dogs
Films based on non-fiction books
Films directed by Simon Cellan Jones
Films produced by Mark Canton
Films produced by Courtney Solomon
Films produced by Mark Wahlberg
Films shot in the Dominican Republic
Upcoming English-language films